Greek Basket League career statistical leaders are the all-time stats leaders of the top-tier level Greek Basket League, since the 1992–93 season, when the league first became recognized by FIBA, as a fully and entirely 100% professional league of basketball. Although the Greek Basket League officially recognizes results and championships from the earlier formats of the league, it only officially recognizes stats since the league's professional era began, with the 1992–93 season. The competition's stats from years prior, when the league was officially classified as amateur, are not officially recognized.

HEBA professional era all-time cumulative stats leaders (since the 1992–93 season)

The following are the all-time stats leaders of the Greek Basket League, since it became fully professional, starting with the 1992–93 season.

 This counts only the stats since HEBA took over the competition, starting with the 1992–93 season.
 Counting only games played in the A1 Division, and not counting any games played in the A2 Division or the Greek Cup:
 1992–93 to 2009–10: HEBA A1
 2010–11 to present: Greek Basket League
 *Currently Active Players in the Greek Basket League:
 Last update: (through 2022–23 season)

Games Played

Points Scored

Total Rebounds

Assists

Steals

Blocks

3 pointers made

Best Tendex performances

References

External links
Official HEBA Site 
Greek Basket League Official English Site 
Insports.gr Greek League First Scorers In Points 
Sport24.gr Greek League Season By Season Best Performers 
Eurobasket.com Greek A1 League By Season
Galanis Sports Data
Tendex Best Performance

statistical leaders
Basketball statistics